Tooth Fairy is a 2004 short film about a father who forgets to leave money for his daughter from the "tooth fairy". When he tries to make up for it the next night, he finds that she has set up a game for the tooth fairy with several clues leading to the location of the tooth.

Written by David Carter and Terry Rietta and directed by Jake Scott, it was released along with four other shorts as part of Amazon.com's Amazon Theater.

Cast
 Chris Noth as Dad
 Jacqueline Walker as Mom
 Wesley Leonard as Joe
 Marina Brandon as Grace
 Dana Brandon as Nora
 Jeff Bezos as Security Guard

References

External links

2004 short films
2004 films
2004 comedy films
Amazon (company)
American comedy short films
2000s American films
Films about tooth fairies